John (Johnnie) White (died 2007) was a high-ranking staff officer of the Official Irish Republican Army (Official IRA) in Derry, Northern Ireland and later Adjutant General of the Irish National Liberation Army (INLA). He was a key figure in Derry in the early years of the Troubles, and played a prominent role in the events surrounding the creation and defence of Free Derry.

External links
Johnny White - An Appreciation (Indymedia)

2007 deaths
Irish National Liberation Army members
Irish republicans
Official Irish Republican Army members
Year of birth missing